Zunbil, also written as Zhunbil, or Rutbils of Zabulistan, was a royal dynasty south of the Hindu Kush in present southern Afghanistan region. They ruled from circa 680 AD until the Saffarid conquest in 870 AD. The Zunbil dynasty was founded by Rutbil (Turkic: Iltäbär), the elder brother of the Turk Shahi ruler (either Barha Tegin or Tegin Shah), who ruled over Hephthalite kingdom from his capital in Kabul. The Zunbils are described as having Turkish troops in their service by Arabic sources like Tarikh al-Tabari and Tarikh-i Sistan.

The faith of this community has not been researched as much. According to the interpretation of Chinese sources by Marquarts and de Groots in 1915, the king of Ts'ao is said to have worn a crown with a golden fish head and was related to the Sogdians. The Temple of the Zun was recognizable by a large fish skeleton on display; this would indicate a related merchantry deity. In addition to that Marquarts states the Zunbils to have worshipped a solar deity which might have been connected to Aditya (Surya). However, according to Shōshin Kuwayama there was a clear dichotomy between worshipers of the Hindu god Surya and followers of Zhun. This is exemplified by the conflict between Surya and Zhun followers, which lead to the followers of Zhun migrating southwards towards Zabulistan from Kapisa. According to André Wink the followers of this god were primarily Hindu, though parallels have also been noted with pre-Buddhist religious and monarchy practices in Tibet and had Zoroastrian influence in its ritual. Other scholars such as H. Schaeder and N. Sims-William have connected it with the Zoroastrian deity of time.

Their territory included between what is now the city of Zaranj in southwestern Afghanistan and Kabulistan in the northeast, with Zamindawar and Ghazni serving as their capitals. In the south their territory reached at times the cities of Rakhwad (al-Rukhkhaj) and Bost (near Kandahar).

The title Zunbil can be traced back to the Middle-Persian original Zūn-dātbar, 'Zun the Justice-giver'. The geographical name Zamindawar would also reflect this, from Middle Persian 'Zamin-i dātbar' (Land of the Justice-giver).

Zabulistan under the Turks

During more than two centuries of their rule, the Tokhara Yabghus, followed by the Turk Shahis and the Zunbils were consistently an obstacle to the eastward expansion of Muslims forces.

Early Arab incursions in Zabulistan

Rashiduns
About 643-644 AD, the Arabs raided Sistan for the first time, and then started to attack the Turkic territory from the southwest.

In 653-4 AD, an army of around 6,000 Arabs was led by general Abd al-Rahman ibn Samura of the Rashidun Caliphate, and they arrived to the shrine of Zoon in Zamindawar. It is reported that Samura "broke off a hand of the idol and plucked out the rubies which were its eyes in order to persuade the marzbān of Sīstān of the god's worthlessness." Samura explained to the marzbān: "my intention was to show you that this idol can do neither any harm nor good."

Umayyad Caliphate
Circa 665 AD, the Arabs under Abd al-Rahman ibn Samura, a general of the Umayyad Caliphate and caliphal governor of Sijistan, captured Kabul for the first time, critically weakening the Nezak Huns. But the Turkic ruler Barha Tegin was soon able to mount a counter-offensive and repulse the Arabs, taking back the areas of Kabul and Zabulistan (around Ghazni), as well as the region of Arachosia as far as Kandahar, and founding the new dynasty of the Turk Shahis circa 665 AD.

Rutbil is first mentioned to have existed during his time, as his earliest mention in Arab sources dates to 666 CE. Rutbil may have been the brother or nephew of Barha Tegin, and may have been appointed as the governor in Zabulistan by Barha Tegin after he conquered the region from Ghar-ilchi.

Rutbil and the king of Kabul campaigned together against the Arabs after Abdur Rahman ibn Samura was replaced as the governor of Sistan. Rabi ibn Ziyad al-Harithi upon assuming governorship in 671 CE attacked Rutbil at Bost, and drove him to al-Rukhkhaj. Rabi's successor Ubayd Allah ibn Abi Bakra continued the war upon being appointed in 673 CE, leading Rutbil to negotiate a peace treaty for both Kabul and Zabul, in which the governor of Sistan acknowledged control of these territories by Rutbil and the King of Kabul.

Establishment of the Zunbils (680 CE)
Around the time the first ruler of the Turk Shahis Barha Tegin died, his dynasty split into two kingdoms. From 680 AD, Tegin Shah became the king of the Turk Shahis, and ruled the area from Kabulistan to Gandhara as well as Zabulistan. His title was "Khorasan Tegin Shah" (meaning "Tegin, King of the East"), and he was known in Chinese sources as Wusan teqin sa. His grand title probably refers to his resistance to the peril of the Umayyad caliph from the west.

In 680-683 AD, Rutbil split from his brother the Shahi of Kabul, and established the Zunbil dynasty, paying temporary allegiance to Salm ibn Ziyad, the Arab governor of Sistan. At the time when Salm ibn Ziyad was governor of Sistan (680-683 AD), Rutbil split from his brother, the Shah of Kabul, and established the Zunbil dynasty, paying temporary allegiance to Salm ibn Ziyad. The area of Zabulistan came to be ruled by Rutbil, also spelled Zibil or Jibul (from Turkic: Iltäbär "Commander").

The relationship between the two relatives was at times antagonistic, but they fought together against Arab incursions. Rubtil issued coins derived from Sassanian prototypes, with a Bactrian script legend on the obverse, a Pahlavi script legend on the reverse, and a short Brahmi script legend in the name of Śrī Vākhudevaḥ ("His Highness the Majestic Lord"):

 
According to Anthony McNicoll, "the Zunbils ruled in the Kandahar area for nearly 250 years until the late 9th century AD". Their main capital Zamindawar was located in the present-day Helmand Province of Afghanistan. The shrine of Zoon was located about three miles south of Musa Qala in Helmand, which may still be traced today. Some believe that the Sunagir temple mentioned by the famous Chinese traveler Xuanzang in 640 AD pertains to this exact house of worship.

Umayyad Caliphate offensives (698-700 CE)
In 698 Ubayd Allah ibn Abi Bakra, governor of Sijistan and a military commander of the Umayyad Caliphate, led an 'Army of Destruction' against the Zunbils. He was defeated and was forced to offer a large tribute, give hostages including three of his sons, and take an oath not to invade the territory of the Zunbils again.

About 700, Al-Hajjaj ibn Yusuf appointed Ibn al-Ash'ath as commander of a huge Iraqi army, the so-called "Peacock Army", to subdue the troublesome principality of Zabulistan. During the campaign, al-Hajjaj's overbearing behaviour caused Ibn al-Ash'ath and the army to rebel. After patching up an agreement with the Zunbils, the army started on its march back to Iraq. On the way, a mutiny against al-Hajjaj developed into a full-fledged anti-Umayyad rebellion.

The Arabs regularly claimed nominal overlordship over the Zunbils, and in 711 Qutayba ibn Muslim managed to force them to pay tribute. In 725–726, Yazid ibn al-Ghurayf, governor of Sistan failed to do so. The Arab would not be able to again obtain tribute from the Zunbils until 769 CE, when Ma'n b. Za'ida al-Shaybanl defeated them near Ghazni.

Khuras and his son Alkhis, lords of Ghazni (714-715 CE)

The Bactrian inscription of Tang-i Safedak, dated to around 714/15 CE, mentions the dedication of a stupa by Alkhis, son of Khuras, lord of "Gazan", thought to be Ghazni. Alkhis is considered as the patron of the second period of florescence of the Buddhist sanctuary of Tapa Sardar, characterized in this period by the creation of hybrid Sinicized-Indian Buddhist art.

Vassalage to the Yabghus of Tokharistan

According to Chinese sources, in particular the chronicles of the Cefu Yuangui, the Turks in Kabul were vassals of the Yabghus of Tokharistan. When a young brother of the Yabghu Pantu Nili, named Puluo (僕羅 Púluó in Chinese sources), visited the court of the Tang dynasty in Xi'an in 718 AD, he gave an account of the military forces in the Tokharistan region. Puluo described the power of "the kings of Tokharistan", explaining that "Two hundred and twelve kingdoms, governors and prefects" recognise the authority of the Yabghus, and that it has been so since the time of his grandfather, that is, probably since the time of the establishment of the Yabghus of Tokharistan. This account also shows that the Yabghu of Tokharistan ruled a vast area circa 718 AD, formed of the territories north and south of the Hindu Kush, including the areas of Kabul and Zabul. Finally, Puluo reaffirmed the loyalty of Yabghu Pantu Nili towards the Tang dynasty.

Part of the Chinese entry for this account by Puluo is:

Chinese influence

Tang dynasty investiture
A few Zunbil rulers are named in Chinese sources, especially Shiquer or Zigil (Chinese:誓屈爾 Shìqū'ér), ruler of Zabulistan from 720 CE and for a few years until 738. A Chinese account from the Tangshu mentions how Zabulistan (Chinese: 誓䫻 Shìyù) was a vassal to the Kabul Shah around 710-720 CE, and how the Zunbil ruler, named "Shiquer", was recognized by the Chinese court in 720 CE. Shiquer received the title of Gedaluozhi Xielifa (Chinese: 葛達羅支頡利發). The word "Geluodazhi" in this extract (Chinese: 葛罗达支, pronounced in Early Middle Chinese: kat-la-dat-tcǐe), is thought to be a transliteration of the ethnonym Khalaj. Xielifa is the known Chinese transcription of the Turkish "Iltäbär", hence Shiquer was "Iltäbär of the Khalaj":

Visit by Hyecho (726 CE)

In 726 CE, the Korean Buddhist monk Hyecho visited Zabulistan (谢䫻国 Xiėyùguó) and recorded that Kabul and Zabul were ruled by Turkic kings, who followed Buddhism. According to him, the King of Kabul was the uncle of the king of Zabul.

Chinese artistic influences (680-750 CE)
Chinese artistic influences, on top of nomical political influence, are discernable in the artistic creations under the Zunbils around that time, as seen in the Buddhist monastery of Tepe Sardar. During the period from 680 to 720 CE, essentially Indian post-Gupta start to blend with Chinese stylistic influences, "a Chinese touch" discernable in Buddhist works of art.

A full-blown "Chinese phase" is attributed to the period from 720 to 750 CE, corresponding to the last major phase of construction and decorations of Buddhist monuments before the Arab conquests. This construction period was possibly marked by the patronage of Alkhis, a contemporary ruler of the Zabul area who was probably of the same ethnicity as the nearby Turk Shahis of Kabul and a member of the Zunbils, or his successors. The period sees a marked evolution in the facial types of the statues, with the Chinese-Indian traits of the previous period moving markedly towards Tang dynasty styles, and clearly following Tang prototypes. Such phenomenon is also seen in the site of Adzina Tepe. It is thought that Buddhism was particularly strong in China during the rule of Empress Wu Zhao (624-705 CE), and that, together the several missions of Chinese pilgrims to Afghanistan and India, Chinese monks settled in Ghazni from around 700 CE. This activity mirrored the active development of monasteries in Xinjiang during the 7th-8th centuries, and highlight a broad territorial unity of Buddhist kingdoms in Western Central Asia at that time, based on intense exchanges and a westward influence of Chinese Buddhism and artistic styles.

The influence of Chinese artistic styles vanishes after 751 CE, when Tang China withdrew from Central Asia following the Battle of Talas.

Abbasid Caliphate claim to overlordship (750 CE)

Arabic sources recount that, after the Abbasids came to power in 750, the Zunbils made submissions to the third Abbasid Caliph al-Mahdi (r. 775–785), but these appear to have been nominal acts, and the people of the region continued to resist Muslim rule. The Muslim historian Ya'qubi (died 897/8) in his Ta'rikh ("History"), recounts that al-Mahdi asked for, and apparently obtained, the submission of various Central Asian rulers, including that of the Zunbils. The original account by Ya'qubi reads:

In 769 CE, the Arabs were again able to obtain tribute from the Zunbils after nearly half a century, when Ma'n b. Za'ida al-Shaybanl defeated them near Ghazni.

Arab destructions are documented around 795 CE, as the Muslim writer Kitāb al-buldān records the destruction of a Šāh Bahār (“Temple of the King”), though to be Tepe Sardar, at that time: he recounts that the Arabs attacked the Šāh Bahār, "in which were idols worshipped by the people. They destroyed and burnt them".

End of the Turk Shahis (822 CE)
In 815 CE, the Abbasids led by caliph Al-Ma'mun defeated the Kabul branch of the Turk Shahis in 815 CE, in what was essentially a political retribution: hoping to take advantage of the Great Abbasid Civil War (811-819 AD), the Turk Shahi ruler, named "Pati Dumi" in Arab sources, had invaded parts of Khorasan. The Turk Shahis not only had to convert to Islam but also had to cede key cities and regions. Another campaign against the Gandhara branch seem to have followed soon, with the Caliphate reaching Indus river, and imposing a critical defeat. A new dynasty, the Hindu Shahi dynasty, took over in Gandhara and Kabul in 822 CE. The Zunbils were unaffected by Al-Ma'mun's raids and continued to rule for about two more decades, before getting embroiled in the conflict to eventual extinction.

Saffarids conquest (870 CE)

The Zunbils were finally defeated in 870 AD by the Muslim conqueror Yaqub bin Laith al-Saffar (r. 861–879 AD, founder of the Saffarid dynasty), who conquered the entire Zunbil territory from his base in Sistan.

Yaqub bin Laith al-Saffar started his eastern conquests in 870/871 CE, when he marched against the Kharijites of Herat, and defeated them. He then marched towards Karukh, and defeated another Khariji leader who was named Abd al-Rahman. His army would then march to Ghazna, conquering the Zunbils, and further to Bamyan and Kabul, pushing the Hindu Shahis to the East, conquering these territories in the name of Islam by appointing Muslim governors. From there they moved to north of the Hindu Kush and by 870 AD the whole of Khorasan was brought under Saffarid control. The Panjshir Valley was now under Ya'qub's control, which made him able to mint silver coins.

According to C.E. Bosworth, the Saffarids achieved, for the first time, Muslim expansion in eastern Afghanistan, after more than two centuries of plundering raids by the Muslim governors of Sistan and fierce resistance from the rulers of the region.

The Hindu Shahis, setting up defenses in Gandhara, continued the resistance to the eastern expansion of Islam until circa 1026 CE.

Religion 
In his travel diaries, the Chinese monk Xuanzang reported in the early 700s that there were numerous Buddhist stupas in the area of Zabul, which may been built by Ashoka in the 3rd century BC. He also reported hundreds of Buddhist monasteries, and dozens of Hindu temples. In addition the temple of the Hindu god Zun was in the region, drawing many pilgrims.

Buddhism

In 726 CE, the Korean Buddhist monk Hyecho visited Zabulistan (谢䫻国 Xiėyùguó) and recorded that Kabul and Zabul were ruled by Turkic kings, who followed Buddhism. The last phase of the Tapa Sardar Buddhist monastery in Ghazni, dates to the time of the Zunbils.

Zhun or Hinduism
The Zunbils worshiped a deity called Zhūn (or Zūn), from whom they derived their name. He is represented with flames radiating from his head on coins. Statues were adorned with gold and used rubies for eyes. Huen Tsang calls him "sunagir".

The origin and nature of Zhun is disputed. M. Shenkar in his study comes to the conclusion that Zhun was possibly connected to the deity of the river Oxus, the modern river Amudarya. Furthermore, he holds it most likely that Zhun was the greatest deity worshiped in Zabulistan. F. Grenet believes that Zhun might have been connected with the Iranian solar deity Mithra. Zhun has been linked with the Hindu god Aditya at Multan, pre-Buddhist religious and kingship practices of Tibet as well as Shaivism. Some scholars have considered the cult to be neither Buddhist nor Zoroastrian, but primarily Hindu. Scholars point out the connections between the Iranian god Zhun/Zun and the Hindu god Shiva, suggesting a syncretic mixture of the Iranian and Indian gods in the Indo-Iranian borderlands of ancient Bactria.

His shrine lay on a sacred mountain in Zamindawar. Originally he appears to have been brought there by Hepthalites, displacing an earlier god on the same site. Parallels have been noted with the pre-Buddhist monarchy of Tibet, next to Zoroastrian influence on its ritual. Whatever his origins, he was certainly superimposed on a mountain and on a pre-existing mountain god while merging with Shaiva doctrines of worship.

Zurvan hypothesis 
Other scholars however have connected Zun with the Sassanid Zoroastrian deity Zurvān, the deity of time.

According to Gulman S, its Afghan followers were, most probably, initially Zoroastrians. Mention of Žun and its devotees disappeared with the end of Žunbil dynasty of Zabulistan in 870. Its followers, according to Ibn Athir, accepted Islam.

According to N. Sims-Williams:

Ulf Jäger states: We should interpret "Zhun" as the name of the ancient Iranian deity of time, "Zurwan".

See also 
 Islamic conquest of Afghanistan
 Pre-Islamic period of Afghanistan
 Religion in Afghanistan

References

Sources

External links 
Zunbil in Encyclopædia Britannica

Notes 
1."Xuanzang's story is simple , but suggests a historical background:there happened a conflict between the two religious groups, the Surya group and the Zhuna group".

Dynasties of Afghanistan
Medieval Afghanistan
Hephthalites